Conus vulcanus is a species of sea snail, a marine gastropod mollusk in the family Conidae, the cone snails and their allies.

Like all species within the genus Conus, these snails are predatory and venomous. They are capable of "stinging" humans, therefore live ones should be handled carefully or not at all.

Description
The size of the shell varies between 18 mm and 31 mm.

Distribution
This species occurs in the Atlantic Ocean on the coast of the island of Boa Vista, Cape Verde.

References

 Tenorio M.J. & Afonso C.M.L. (2004) Description of four new species of Conus from the Cape Verde Islands (Gastropoda, Conidae). Visaya 1(2): 24–37
  Puillandre N., Duda T.F., Meyer C., Olivera B.M. & Bouchet P. (2015). One, four or 100 genera? A new classification of the cone snails. Journal of Molluscan Studies. 81: 1–23

External links
 The Conus Biodiversity website
 Cone Shells – Knights of the Sea
 

vulcanus
Gastropods described in 2004
Gastropods of Cape Verde